The Woodcock Nature Center is a non-profit nature center located at 56 Deer Run Road in Wilton, Connecticut.

The center's building houses of local and exotic snakes, frogs and lizards, as well as a few rehabilitated birds of prey that were too injured to be released back into the wild.

The center offers summer camp, after school, and other programs for children and school groups.

History
After a 1955 flood devastated the Norwalk River Valley, the state of Connecticut bought up and safety-dammed several feeder streams in order to control floods.  About 1969, Ridgefield First Selectman J. Mortimer Woodcock arranged to lease  of the property along Spectacle Creek in Wilton and Ridgefield (130 acres in Wilton) for a nature center, and in 1972 the Woodcock Nature Center was opened.

References

External links

 Woodcock Nature Center

Nature centers in Connecticut
Tourist attractions in Fairfield County, Connecticut
Buildings and structures in Wilton, Connecticut
Protected areas of Fairfield County, Connecticut
Education in Fairfield County, Connecticut